This article contains information about the literary events and publications of 1753.

Events
c. January – Mercy Seccombe, having emigrated from Harvard, Massachusetts to Nova Scotia, Canada, begins the earliest recorded diary by a woman in North America.
February 1 – Christopher Smart makes his last contribution to the Paper War of 1752–1753, with The Hilliad, which one critic, Lance Bertelsen, describes as the "loudest broadside" of the war.
February 2 – Jane Austen's aunt Philadelphia, mother of Eliza de Feuillide, marries Tysoe Saul Hancock in India.
March 25 – Voltaire leaves the court of Frederik II of Prussia
December – The Paper War of 1752–1753 comes to a close, with the withdrawal of everyone except John Hill

New books

Fiction
Sarah Fielding – The Adventures of David Simple, Volume the Last
Eliza Haywood – The History of Jemmy and Jenny
Samuel Richardson – The History of Sir Charles Grandison
Tobias Smollett – The Adventures of Ferdinand Count Fathom

Drama
Giacomo Casanova – La Moluccheide
Kitty Clive – The Rehearsal
Samuel Foote – The Englishman in Paris
Richard Glover – Boadicea
Carlo Goldoni
The Mistress of the Inn (La locandiera)
Servant of Two Masters (Il servitore di due padroni, revised)
Henry Jones – The Earl of Essex
Edward Moore – The Gamester
Voltaire – L'Orphelin de la Chine
Edward Young – The Brothers

Poetry

John Armstrong – Taste
Thomas Cooke – An Ode on Benevolence
Robert Dodsley – Public Virtue
Thomas Franklin – Translation
Richard Gifford – Contemplation
Thomas Gray and Richard Bentley the younger – Designs by Mr. R. Bently for Six Poems by Mr. T. Gray
Henry Jones – Merit
William Kenrick – The Whole Duty of Woman
Heyat Mahmud – Hitaggyānbāṇī; Bengali
Christopher Smart – The Hilliad
Thomas Warton – The Union
George Whitefield – Hymns for Social Worship

Non-fiction
Theophilus Cibber – The Lives of the Poets
Jane Collier – An Essay on the Art of Ingeniously Tormenting
William Hogarth – The Analysis of Beauty
David Hume – Essays and Treatises
Charlotte Lennox – Shakespear Illustrated, or, The novels and histories on which the plays of Shakespear are founded, vol. 1
Christopher Pitt et al. – The Works of Virgil in Latin and English
Thomas Richards of Coychurch – Antiquæ linguæ Britannicæ thesaurus
Henry St. John – A Letter to Sir William Windham
John Toland – Hypatia
William Warburton – The Principles of Natural and Revealed Religion

Births
March 8 – William Roscoe, English historian and miscellaneous writer (died 1831)
March 13 – József Fabchich, Hungarian translator of Greek and lexicographer (died 1809)
April 8 – Pigault-Lebrun, French novelist and playwright (died 1835)
April 11 – Sophia Burrell, English poet and dramatist (died 1802)
May 8 – Phillis Wheatley, African-American poet (died 1784)
June 26 – Antoine de Rivarol, French Royalist writer (died 1801)
July 8 – Ann Yearsley, née Cromartie, English poet, writer and library proprietor (died 1806)
August 11 – Thomas Bewick, English engraver, writer and natural historian (died 1828)
September 16 – Märta Helena Reenstierna, Swedish diarist (died 1841)
October 15 – Elizabeth Inchbald, English novelist, dramatist and actress (died 1821)
October 16 – Johann Gottfried Eichhorn, German Protestant theologian (died 1827)

Deaths
January 14 – Bishop George Berkeley, Irish philosopher (born 1685)
May 11 – Jean-Joseph Languet de Gergy, French theologian (born 1677)
May 23 – Franciszka Urszula Radziwiłłowa, Polish dramatist (born 1705)
June 13 – Marie Huber, Swiss theologian, editor and translator (born 1695)
September 18 – Hristofor Zhefarovich, Macedonian artist and poet (date of birth unknown)
November – Giuseppe Valentini, Italian poet, composer and painter (born 1681)
November 24 – Nicholas Mann, English antiquarian (date of birth unknown)
Unknown dates
John Richardson, English Quaker preacher and autobiographer (born 1667)

References

 
Years of the 18th century in literature